Walter C. Kaiser Jr. (born April 11, 1933) is an American Evangelical Old Testament scholar, writer, public speaker, and educator. Kaiser is the Colman M. Mockler distinguished Professor of Old Testament and former President of Gordon-Conwell Theological Seminary in South Hamilton, Massachusetts, retired June 30, 2006. He was succeeded by James Emery White.

Life and career
Kaiser was born in 1933 in Folcroft, Pennsylvania of German Baptist parents, Walter Christian Kaiser Sr. and Estelle Jaworsky Kaiser. He earned his A.B. from Wheaton College, his B.D. from Wheaton Graduate School, and both his M.A. and Ph.D. in Mediterranean studies from Brandeis University. Until 2006, he served as president of Gordon-Conwell Theological Seminary (GCTS). Previous to his appointment at GCTS he was academic dean and Professor of Old Testament at Trinity Evangelical Divinity School, where he taught for more than twenty years. In 1977 he served as president of the Evangelical Theological Society. A recipient of the Danforth Teacher Study Grant, Kaiser is a member of the Wheaton College Scholastic Honor Society.

Prior to coming to Gordon-Conwell, Kaiser taught Bible and archeology at Wheaton College and taught at Trinity Evangelical Divinity School in several capacities. In addition to teaching in the Old Testament department, he was senior vice president of education, academic dean, and senior vice president of distance learning and ministries. Kaiser currently serves on the boards of several Christian organizations.

Kaiser has contributed to such publications as Journal for the Study of the Old Testament, Journal of the Evangelical Theological Society, Christianity Today, Westminster Theological Journal, and Evangelical Quarterly. He has also written numerous books. He is a critic of, and rejects the Documentary Hypothesis.

Works

Books

 - other bible versions and editions are available

 - in progress

Chapters and Contributions

Journal articles

References

Further reading
 Gordon-Conwell Staff Profile
Marge Kaiser

External links
 Walter Kaiser Jr. sermons at Aisquith Presbyterian Church http://www.aisquith.org/audio-sermons/?preacher=10

1933 births
Living people
20th-century American theologians
20th-century evangelicals
21st-century American theologians
21st-century evangelicals
American biblical scholars
American evangelicals
Brandeis University alumni
Evangelical theologians
Gordon–Conwell Theological Seminary faculty
Old Testament scholars
Seminary presidents
Wheaton College (Illinois) alumni